Dasa Purandara is an Indian television drama in the Kannada language that premiered on the Colors Kannada channel on 28 February 2022. The show is based on the life of philosopher, saint and musician Purnadara Dasa. Music for the series is composed by Karthik Sharma.

The show premiered on 28 February 2022 during the weekdays. The show was later aired on weekends.

Cast 
 Deepak Subramanya as Srinivasa
 Chandrakala Mohan as Shanthamma
 N. T. Ramaswamy as Krishnaraya
 Amulya Bharadwaj as Saraswathi
 Shreya 
 Lakshmi Nadagodu

References 

2022 Indian television series debuts
Indian television soap operas
Kannada-language television shows
Serial drama television series
Colors Kannada original programming